Alan Bowman may refer to:
 Alan Bowman (classicist)
 Alan Bowman (American football)